Jens Eriksson (born August 22, 1984) is a Swedish Ice hockey player, currently playing for Guildford Flames of the English Premier Ice Hockey League.

Playing career

References

External links 

1984 births
Living people
Swedish ice hockey forwards
Swedish expatriates in England
Grüner Ishockey players
Guildford Flames players
Hockey Club de Reims players
Les Aigles de Nice players
LHC Les Lions players
Manglerud Star Ishockey players
Ours de Villard-de-Lans players
Scorpions de Mulhouse players
Sportspeople from Västerås
VIK Västerås HK players